Salmaan Moerat (born 6 March 1998) is a South African rugby union player for the  in Super Rugby and  in the Currie Cup and in the Rugby Challenge. His regular position is lock.

References

External links
 

South African rugby union players
Living people
1998 births
Cape Coloureds
Sportspeople from Paarl
Rugby union locks
Stormers players
South Africa Under-20 international rugby union players
Western Province (rugby union) players
Rugby union players from the Western Cape
South Africa international rugby union players